Catherine Rosales Garcia-Molina (born November 28, 1971) is a Filipino film and television director best known for directing romantic comedy and family drama films produced and distributed by Star Cinema. She has also directed a few TV series, which aired on ABS-CBN, where she is one of the resident directors. Her films have frequently become some of the highest-grossing films in the Philippines.

Her 2019 film, Hello, Love, Goodbye, starring Kathryn Bernardo and Alden Richards, became the highest grossing Philippine film of all time. The film displaced Garcia-Molina's other film The Hows of Us (2018), which used to hold the record, and which is now the 2nd highest grossing Filipino film of all time.

Major films

One More Chance (2007)

In 2007, Molina worked with John Lloyd Cruz and Bea Alonzo for the second time in the film One More Chance (first time was in the film Close to You), released by Star Cinema. It differed from her previous films, becoming her first romantic film to contain such solid drama and a mature feeling. In an interview, she stated "This one's different, though, as it's more of a drama and not really a romantic-comedy. In romantic comedies, we usually follow the formula of the two lovers having a cute meet, then they start fighting each other, but you know that in the end, they will still end up in each other's arms. This time, the film opens showing the lovers [...] breaking up right at the start of the story. That's why this is really different from any movie I've done before or any movie John Lloyd and Bea have made in the past." The film was given a B rating by the Cinema Evaluation Board (CEB), saying "[Cruz and Alonzo] have graduated from their bubble-gummy roles and can really be considered serious actors now." The board also described their performance as "very good and sensitive." Aside from receiving positive response from film critics, the film did well in the box-office, grossing ₱66,334,614 in its opening weekend. It grossed a total of ₱152,791,025 ($3,684,908), becoming the highest-grossing Filipino film of 2007, and the fourth highest-grossing film of 2007 in the Philippines, behind Spider-Man 3, Transformers and Harry Potter and the Order of the Phoenix. The film also won Molina the Movie Director of the Year trophy in the 2008 PCPI Star Awards for Movies.

A Very Special Love (2008)

In 2008, Molina directed A Very Special Love, a romantic comedy film which talks about Laida Magtalas (portrayed by Sarah Geronimo) who is a fresh graduate and applies for a job in a magazine publishing company owned by Miggy Montenegro (played by John Lloyd Cruz). Laida is a simple girl and is the breadwinner of her family, while Miggy is a rich, handsome businessman. The movie is about two young people with totally different backgrounds, but they discover that love truly knows no barriers. It is the first film of Cruz and Geronimo together, after their successful team-up in an episode of the Maalaala Mo Kaya TV series entitled "Kwintas". The film was released as part of Star Cinema's fifteenth anniversary, in collaboration with VIVA Films. It marked the first project that Molina has worked with Geronimo. Molina expressed that people knew Geronimo for being a dramatic actress, based on the TV series she has appeared on, and that she wanted to show the lightness of the actress. She described Geronimo as "light and kikay," saying that it was easy to work with her. A Very Special Love was rated A by the CEB, with its comedic and innocent concept in contrast to One More Chance. The film earned ₱58,448,223 at the box-office in its opening weekend. It became a commercial success, grossing a total of ₱179,569,117 ($3,836,701) and becoming the highest-grossing Filipino film of 2008 (second highest-grossing film of 2008 in the Philippines behind Iron Man). The film later overtook Ang Tanging Ina in terms of revenue, and is currently the fifth highest-grossing Filipino film of all time. It also earned Molina three Best Director nominations from major awarding organizations.

You Changed My Life (2009)

In 2009, Star Cinema and VIVA Films released the much-awaited sequel to A Very Special Love, entitled You Changed My Life. The film was rushed, since the production companies wanted the sequel to have a Valentine's Day release. The film was directed, still, by Molina, with John Lloyd Cruz and Sarah Geronimo reprising their roles. Rayver Cruz was cast as Mackoy, Laida's high school best friend who later broke away for their group and went to a different college. The story revolves around the growing relationship of Miggy and Laida as a couple. Things get tough when Miggy was assigned to manage his family's business in Laguna far from Laida. Having no time for his girl, Laida finds comfort in Mackoy's arms. Like its prequel, the film was also rated A by the CEB and received positive reviews from movie critics. Karen A. Pagsolingan of Philippine Entertainment Portal stated "I have two words for the movie: Entertaining and engaging!" She described the plot as "flawless," and praised Molina's surprises and "avant garde tactics." You Changed My Life earned ₱97,893,449 in its opening weekend, becoming the highest opening weekend for a Filipino film. The film was a box-office hit, grossing a total of ₱230,436,128 ($4,724,411) and eventually becoming the highest-grossing Filipino film in record time. It is also the first Filipino film to surpass the ₱200 million mark, after Ruel S. Bayani's No Other Woman did the same in 2011. You Changed My Life was the highest-grossing Filipino film of 2009 and the fifth highest-grossing film of 2009 in the Philippines behind Transformers: Revenge of the Fallen, Avatar, The Twilight Saga: New Moon and 2012. The film earned Molina a Best Director nomination from the 2010 ENPRESS Golden Screen Awards.

Miss You Like Crazy (2010)

In 2010, Molina's fifth project with John Lloyd Cruz and third with Bea Alonzo, entitled Miss You Like Crazy, was released under Star Cinema. Like One More Chance, the film is a romantic drama with a mature concept. Cruz and Alonzo played the roles of star-crossed lovers, Alan Alvarez and Mia Samonte. Fate throws them chances to be together, but time is not their ally. When they first meet on board the Pasig River Ferry Service, they are instantly attracted to each other. Both of them are from the middle-class and are down-to-earth. As they bond over Divisoria shopping and all-night conversations over coffee, Allan starts to doubt his feelings for his high maintenance fiancée Daphne (portrayed by Maricar Reyes) who happens to be the daughter of his boss. Sooner, Alan and Mia learn that "time is meaningless when you're in love." The film was shot both in the Philippines and Malaysia. The performance of the cast was praised by critics, but the story was panned film reviewers. Philippine Entertainment Portal stated "Star Cinema's weakness is its inability to produce a realistic ending [...] this perfect world only exists in fairy tales. In the real world, the more prevailing concepts are moving on and acceptance." The same opinion was given by Manila Bulletin, saying "A Cathy Molina film always ends happily, although one would probably hope it wouldn’t, for a change, and adhere to a bit of realism [...] Another problem was the unexplored subplots." Despite mixed response to the film, Miss You Like Crazy became a commercial hit, grossing a total of ₱138.27 million ($3,183,529) in the box-office and becoming the second highest-grossing Filipino film of 2010 only behind My Amnesia Girl, which also stars Cruz in the lead role.

Personal life
Catherine Rosales Garcia-Molina was born on November 28, 1971 in Quezon City, Philippines. She is the youngest child of the late Sikatuna Antonio Garcia (1929—1983) and Luisa Rosales Garcia.

She was married to engineer and technical director Philip Rey "Epoy" Molina (who died from a vehicular accident in 2009) with two children.

Verbal harassment controversy
In 2014, Rosselyn Domingo and her boyfriend Alvin Campomanes, a history professor from the University of the Philippines, who played as bit players in the teleseries Forevermore, accused Molina, talent supplier John Leonardo and a woman named "Jeng" of mistreatment of their extra. Domingo points that Molina allegedly spoke expletives and humiliated her and Campomanes during a taping of the drama series shot in Benguet. The open letter of Domingo with a complaint of Campomanes addressed to Cory Vidanes, ABS-CBN's COO, originally posted on Facebook on December 31, 2015. Film director Peque Gallaga backed the two talent's testimonies against Molina.

Molina, admitted in an interview with TV host Boy Abunda that she cursed the two "extras" during a taping with "good intentions" and asked for a dialogue between her and the two complainants to settle the issue.

Casting
Molina often casts certain actors more than once in her films. She has consistently worked with Kathryn Bernardo, Bea Alonzo, Sarah Geronimo, Toni Gonzaga, Daniel Padilla, Sam Milby and John Lloyd Cruz.

Notes
 1 Cruz made a cameo appearance in My Only Ü.
 2 Cruz and Geronimo reprised their roles as Miggy Montenegro and Laida Magtalas.
 3 Locsin made a cameo appearance in My Amnesia Girl.
 4 Zulueta and Gomez made a special participation in She's Dating the Gangster and considered as the main cast of the film because of taking the role of adult version of Bernardo and Padilla.
 5 Cruz and Alonzo reprised their roles as "Popoy" and "Basha".

Filmography

Film

Television

Cameo appearances

Awards and nominations

References

External links
Cathy Garcia Molina at the Internet Movie Database
 Talent, boyfriend seek justice after ‘cursing, humiliation’ from director Cathy Molina

1971 births
Living people
Filipino film directors
Filipino television directors
Filipino women film directors
Films directed by Cathy Garcia-Molina
ABS-CBN people
Women television directors